In molecular biology, this entry refers to a protein domain called, the Vitelline membrane outer layer protein I (VMO-I). It is a structure found on the outside of an egg, in the vitelline membrane.

Function
The major role of the vitelline membrane is to prevent the mixing of the yolk and albumen and also act as an important anti-microbial barrier, as indicated by the high content of lysozyme in the outer layer 
Vitelline membrane outer layer protein I (VMO-I) binds tightly to  ovomucin fibrils, which construct the backbone of the outer layer membrane. VMO-I has considerable activity to synthesize N-acetylchito-oligosaccharide from N-acetylglucosamine hexasaccharides but no hydrolysis activity.  VMO-I is composed of 163 aa

Structure
The structure consists of three beta-sheets forming Greek key motifs, which are related by an internal pseudo three-fold symmetry. Furthermore, the structure of VOMI has strong similarity to the structure of the delta-endotoxin, as well as a carbohydrate-binding site in the top region of the common fold. VMO-I revealed a unique structure of the P-prism fold, a new type of multi-sheet assembly.

References

Protein families